Lin Guanghao (born 14 August 1959) is a Chinese cross-country skier. He competed at the 1980 Winter Olympics and the 1984 Winter Olympics.

References

External links
 

1959 births
Living people
Chinese male cross-country skiers
Olympic cross-country skiers of China
Cross-country skiers at the 1980 Winter Olympics
Cross-country skiers at the 1984 Winter Olympics
Place of birth missing (living people)